The pluralistic society movement is a political party headed by the Syrian politician Randa Kassis, which aims to establish a "free, democratic, secular Syria" by spreading democratic awareness and developing the rules of thinking regarding the concept of freedom.

Foundation 
On October 10, 2012, a group of Syrian dissidents in Paris, led by Syrian political leader Randa Kassis, launched a new opposition movement called the Syrian "Movement for a Pluralistic Society" which aims to represent all sectors of Syrian society to ensure a successful transitional phase after the fall of the Syrian regime led by Bashar al-Assad.

Principles

The basic concepts 
The plurality of the Syrian society constitutes the basis of this movement.

Universal Declaration of Human Rights 
The movement seeks to implement the Universal Declaration of Human Rights, raise democratic awareness, and develop rules of crucial thinking regarding the concept of freedom and seeks to develop it.

Woman 
The movement believes that women are half of the society, and therefore they have the same duties as men. They also have the same rights as men on equal footing. Among the social priorities of the movement are the elimination of all tribal, family and sectarian affiliations, Instead of resorting to other protections, which are an urgent need for the human being when he lacks a legal-civilized incubator that protects him, and the pride of the citizen to his Syrian identity only.

Public policy 
The pluralistic movement of society believes in social liberalism, mostly individual freedoms such as freedom of belief, freedom of thought and freedom of expression.

The Movement believes that democratic-liberal societies are not the best forms of political systems but the best available among the world's prevailing regimes. Therefore, the Movement believes that some changes must be made to the democratic-civil system in Syrian society in proportion to this society's needs and necessities.

The Movement believes in reconciling Syria, with its geographical surroundings and good relations with neighbouring countries. This vision stems from the fact that Syria's important geographic position is a point of contact between Asia and Africa with the two European countries.

The Movement accepts in its membership all Syrians and who believe in the Movement's approach to match the age with the laws and constitutions allowed by citizens to participate in electoral processes and democracy.

The Statutes 
-The statutes of the pluralist movement of society are based on several grounds:

-The leaders of the masses exercise their powers based on the principle of democratic centralism to lay out the outlines of the movement.

-The movement seeks to bring about historical changes in society that aim to create ethical values consistent with the components and individuals' common interests to revive the sense of "human" and "individual" value.

- All members of the movement are equal in rights and duties, and the field is open to the elements conscious, sincere and active to advance ranks and occupy command and guidance-centres.

-Through its struggle, the movement seeks to mobilize the masses to form the members of the movement

Activities 
In May 2015, the movement participated in the meetings of the Syrian opposition in Astana and the final declaration stating the importance of a political solution in Syria.

In April 2016, the movement participated in United Nations' Geneva meetings to reach a political solution in Syria. 

In September 2016, Russian Deputy Foreign Minister and Special Presidential Representative for the Middle East and Africa Mikhail Bogdanov conducted several meetings at the Russian Foreign Ministry with representatives of the Moscow, Astana and Cairo groups of the Syrian opposition Qadri Jamil, Randa Kassis, Jihad Makdissi and Jamal Suleiman, including a round of collective consultations.

In May 2017, United Nations Special Envoy Staffan de Mistura met with President of the Pluralistic Society Movement Randa Kassis to discuss the deteriorating situation in Syria and the growing humanitarian concerns and the attempt to find a political solution. 

In February 2019, Randa Kassis, President of the movement and with Fabien Baussart, President of the Center for Political and Foreign Relations met with Bilbot Atamakov, Minister of Foreign Affairs of the Republic of Kazakhstan.

In March 2019, Randa Kassis, President of the movement, met with Joel Rayburn, US Special Envoy to Syria and Deputy Assistant Secretary of State. They discussed the need to support a constructive political process in Syria.

References

Politics of Syria